Attorney General Browning may refer to:

Abraham Browning (1808–1889), Attorney General of New Jersey
Chauncey Browning Sr. (1903–1971), Attorney General of West Virginia
Chauncey H. Browning Jr. (1934–2010), Attorney General of West Virginia

See also
General Browning (disambiguation)